Serhiy Volodomyrovych Klymentiev (born April 5, 1975) is a Ukrainian former professional ice hockey defenceman.

Career
Klymentiev was named best defenceman at the C Pool of the 1993 World Junior Ice Hockey Championships held in Odense, Denmark. He played junior hockey for the Medicine Hat Tigers in the WHL during the 1993–1994 and 1994–1995 seasons. He was drafted by the Buffalo Sabres 121st overall in the 1994 NHL Entry Draft and spent 3 seasons with their American Hockey League affiliate the Rochester Americans. In 1998, he signed with the Philadelphia Flyers and was once more sent to the AHL, suiting up for the Philadelphia Phantoms. He was traded to the Nashville Predators for cash in the same season, playing for the Milwaukee Admirals their International Hockey League affiliate. He returned to Russia in 1999 having never played in the National Hockey League. He only ever returned to North America once, where he played seven games for the IHL's Houston Aeros. He retired in 2013 and as of that time works as an assistant coach of Sokil Kyiv.

Career statistics

Regular season and playoffs

International

References

External links

1975 births
Living people
Avangard Omsk players
Buffalo Sabres draft picks
Expatriate ice hockey players in Russia
Ak Bars Kazan players
HC MVD players
Metallurg Magnitogorsk players
Medicine Hat Tigers players
Milwaukee Admirals (IHL) players
Sportspeople from Kyiv
Philadelphia Phantoms players
Rochester Americans players
Salavat Yulaev Ufa players
Sokil Kyiv players
Torpedo Nizhny Novgorod players
Ukrainian ice hockey defencemen
Chevaliers of the Order of Merit (Ukraine)
HC Budivelnyk players
Olympic ice hockey players of Ukraine
Ice hockey players at the 2002 Winter Olympics
Ukrainian expatriate sportspeople in Canada
Ukrainian expatriate sportspeople in the United States
Ukraine men's national ice hockey team coaches